Persicula obesa is a species of sea snail, a marine gastropod mollusk, in the family Cystiscidae.

References

obesa
Gastropods described in 1846
Cystiscidae